Arnold River may refer to:
Arnold River (Northern Territory), a tributary of the Hodgson River in Australia
Arnold River (New Zealand), a tributary of the Grey River
Arnold River (Saskatchewan), a tributary of the Rapid River in Canada
Arnold River (lac aux Araignées), Quebec, Canada